Moscow (US chiefly) is the capital and largest city of Russia. The city stands on the Moskva River in Central Russia, with a population estimated at 13.0 million residents within the city limits, over 17 million residents in the urban area, and over 21.5 million residents in the metropolitan area. Moscow is among the world's largest cities; being the most populous city entirely in Europe, the largest urban and metropolitan area in Europe, and the largest city by land area on the European continent.

First documented in 1147, Moscow grew to become a prosperous and powerful city that served as the capital of the Grand Duchy of Moscow. When the Tsardom of Russia was proclaimed, Moscow remained the political and economic center for most of its history. Under the reign of Peter the Great, the Russian capital was moved to the newly founded city of Saint Petersburg in 1712, diminishing Moscow's influence. Following the Russian Revolution and the establishment of the Russian SFSR, the capital was moved back to Moscow in 1918, where it later became the political center of the Soviet Union. In the aftermath of the dissolution of the Soviet Union, Moscow remained the capital city of the newly established Russian Federation.

The northernmost and coldest megacity in the world, Moscow is governed as a federal city, where it serves as the political, economic, cultural, and scientific center of Russia and Eastern Europe. As an alpha world city, Moscow has one of the world's largest urban economies. The city is one of the fastest-growing tourist destinations in the world, and is one of Europe's most visited cities. Moscow is home to the seventh-highest number of billionaires of any city in the world.  The Moscow International Business Center is one of the largest financial centers in Europe and the world, and features the majority of Europe's tallest skyscrapers. Moscow was the host city of the 1980 Summer Olympics, and one of the host cities of the 2018 FIFA World Cup.

As the historic core of Russia, Moscow serves as the home of numerous Russian artists, scientists, and sports figures due to the presence of its various museums, academic and political institutions, and theaters. The city is home to several UNESCO World Heritage Sites and is well known for its display of Russian architecture, particularly its historic Red Square, and buildings such as the Saint Basil's Cathedral and the Moscow Kremlin, of which the latter serves as the seat of power of the Government of Russia. Moscow is home to many Russian companies in numerous industries and is served by a comprehensive transit network, which includes four international airports, ten railway terminals, a tram system, a monorail system, and most notably the Moscow Metro, the busiest metro system in Europe, and one of the largest rapid transit systems in the world. The city has over 40 percent of its territory covered by greenery, making it one of the greenest cities in Europe and the world.

Etymology
The name of the city is thought to be derived from the name of the Moskva River. Several theories of the origin of the name of the river have been proposed. Finno-Ugric Merya and Muroma people, who were among the several pre-Slavic tribes which originally inhabited the area, called the river supposedly Mustajoki, in English: Black river. It has been suggested that the name of the city derives from this term.

The most linguistically well-grounded and widely accepted is from the Proto-Balto-Slavic root *mŭzg-/muzg- from the Proto-Indo-European *- "wet", so the name Moskva might signify a river at a wetland or a marsh. Its cognates include ,  "pool, puddle",  and  "to wash",  "to drown",  "to dip, immerse". In many Slavic countries Moskov is a surname, most common in Russia, Bulgaria, Ukraine and North Macedonia. Additionally, there are similarly named places in Poland like Mozgawa.

The original Old Russian form of the name is reconstructed as *, *, hence it was one of a few Slavic ū-stem nouns.

In a similar manner the Latin name  has been formed, later it became a colloquial name for Russia used in Western Europe in the 16th–17th centuries. From it as well came English Muscovy and muscovite.

Various other theories (of Celtic, Iranian, Caucasic origins), having little or no scientific ground, are now largely rejected by contemporary linguists.

Other names
Moscow has acquired several epithets, most referring to its size and preeminent status within the nation: The Third Rome, the Whitestone One, the First Throne, the Forty Soroks ("sorok" meaning both "forty, a great many" and "a district or parish" in Old Russian). Moscow is also one of the twelve Hero Cities. The demonym for a Moscow resident is "" (moskvich) for male or "ка" (moskvichka) for female, rendered in English as Muscovite. The name "Moscow" is abbreviated "MSK" ( in Russian).

History

Prehistory
Archaeological digs show that the site of today's Moscow and the surrounding area have been inhabited since time immemorial. Among the earliest finds are relics of the Lyalovo culture, which experts assign to the Neolithic period, the last phase of the Stone Age.

They confirm that the first inhabitants of the area were hunters and gatherers. Around 950 AD, two Slavic tribes, Vyatichi and Krivichi, settled here. Possibly the Vyatichi formed the core of Moscow's indigenous population.

Early history (1147–1284)

The first known reference to Moscow dates from 1147 as a meeting place of Yuri Dolgoruky and Sviatoslav Olgovich. At the time it was a minor town on the western border of Vladimir-Suzdal Principality. The chronicle says, "Come, my brother, to Moskov".

In 1156, Knyaz Yuri Dolgorukiy fortified the town with a timber fence and a moat. In the course of the Mongol invasion of Kievan Rus', the Mongols under Batu Khan burned the city to the ground and killed its inhabitants.

The timber fort na Moskvě "on the Moscow River" was inherited by Daniel, the youngest son of Alexander Nevsky, in the 1260s, at the time considered the least valuable of his father's possessions.

Daniel came of age in the 1270s and became involved in the power struggles of the principality with lasting success, siding with his brother Dmitry in his bid for the rule of Novgorod. From 1283 he acted as the ruler of an independent principality alongside Dmitry, who became Grand Duke of Vladimir.
Daniel has been credited with founding the first Moscow monasteries, dedicated to the Lord's Epiphany and to Saint Daniel.

Grand Duchy (1283–1547)

Daniel ruled Moscow as Grand Duke until 1303 and established it as a prosperous city that would eclipse its parent principality of Vladimir by the 1320s.

Daniel died in 1303, at the age of 42. Before his death, he became a monk and, according to his will, was buried in the cemetery of the St. Daniel Monastery.

Moscow was quite stable and prosperous for many years and attracted a large number of refugees from across Russia. The Rurikids maintained large landholdings by practicing primogeniture, whereby all land was passed to the eldest sons, rather than dividing it up among all sons. By 1304, Yury of Moscow contested with Mikhail of Tver for the throne of the principality of Vladimir. Ivan I eventually defeated Tver to become the sole collector of taxes for the Mongol rulers, making Moscow the capital of Vladimir-Suzdal. By paying high tribute, Ivan won an important concession from the Khan.

While the Khan of the Golden Horde initially attempted to limit Moscow's influence, when the growth of the Grand Duchy of Lithuania began to threaten all of Russia, the Khan strengthened Moscow to counterbalance Lithuania, allowing it to become one of the most powerful cities in Russia. In 1380, prince Dmitry Donskoy of Moscow led a united Russian army to an important victory over the Mongols in the Battle of Kulikovo. Afterward, Moscow took the leading role in liberating Russia from Mongol domination. In 1480, Ivan III had finally broken the Russians free from Tatar control, and Moscow became the capital of an empire that would eventually encompass all of Russia and Siberia, and parts of many other lands.

In 1462 Ivan III, (1440–1505) became Grand Prince of Moscow (then part of the medieval Muscovy state). He began fighting the Tatars, enlarged the territory of Muscovy, and enriched his capital city. By 1500 it had a population of 100,000 and was one of the largest cities in the world. He conquered the far larger principality of Novgorod to the north, which had been allied to the hostile Lithuanians. He took control of the ancient "Novgorod Chronicle" and made it a propaganda vehicle for his regime.

The original Moscow Kremlin was built in the 14th century. It was reconstructed by Ivan, who in the 1480s invited architects from Renaissance Italy, such as Petrus Antonius Solarius, who designed the new Kremlin wall and its towers, and Marco Ruffo who designed the new palace for the prince. The Kremlin walls as they now appear are those designed by Solarius, completed in 1495. The Kremlin's Great Bell Tower was built in 1505–08 and augmented to its present height in 1600.

A trading settlement, or posad, grew up to the east of the Kremlin, in the area known as Zaradye (Зарядье). In the time of Ivan III, the Red Square, originally named the Hollow Field (Полое поле) appeared.

In 1508–1516, the Italian architect Aleviz Fryazin (Novy) arranged for the construction of a moat in front of the eastern wall, which would connect the Moskva and Neglinnaya and be filled in with water from Neglinnaya.

Tsardom (1547–1721)

In the 16th and 17th centuries, the three circular defenses were built: Kitay-gorod (Китай-город), the White City (Белый город) and the Earthen City (Земляной город). However, in 1547, two fires destroyed much of the town, and in 1571 the Crimean Tatars captured Moscow, burning everything except the Kremlin. The annals record that only 30,000 of 200,000 inhabitants survived.

The Crimean Tatars attacked again in 1591, but this time were held back by new defense walls, built between 1584 and 1591 by a craftsman named Fyodor Kon. In 1592, an outer earth rampart with 50 towers was erected around the city, including an area on the right bank of the Moscow River. As an outermost line of defense, a chain of strongly fortified monasteries was established beyond the ramparts to the south and east, principally the Novodevichy Convent and Donskoy, Danilov, Simonov, Novospasskiy, and Andronikov monasteries, most of which now house museums. From its ramparts, the city became poetically known as Bielokamennaya, the "White-Walled." The city's limits as marked by the ramparts built in 1592 are now marked by the Garden Ring.

Three square gates existed on the eastern side of the Kremlin wall, which in the 17th century, were known as Konstantino-Eleninsky, Spassky, Nikolsky (owing their names to the icons of Constantine and Helen, the Saviour and St. Nicholas that hung over them). The last two were directly opposite the Red Square, while the Konstantino-Elenensky gate was located behind Saint Basil's Cathedral.

The Russian famine of 1601–03 killed perhaps 100,000 in Moscow. From 1610 through 1612, troops of the Polish–Lithuanian Commonwealth occupied Moscow, as its ruler Sigismund III tried to take the Russian throne. In 1612, the people of Nizhny Novgorod and other Russian cities conducted by prince Dmitry Pozharsky and Kuzma Minin rose against the Polish occupants, besieged the Kremlin, and expelled them. In 1613, the Zemsky sobor elected Michael Romanov tsar, establishing the Romanov dynasty. The 17th century was rich in popular risings, such as the liberation of Moscow from the Polish–Lithuanian invaders (1612), the Salt Riot (1648), the Copper Riot (1662), and the Moscow Uprising of 1682.

During the first half of the 17th century, the population of Moscow doubled from roughly 100,000 to 200,000. It expanded beyond its ramparts in the later 17th century. It is estimated, that in the middle of the 17th century, 20% of Moscow suburb's inhabitants were from the Grand Duchy of Lithuania, practically all of them being driven from their homeland to Moscow by Muscovite invaders. By 1682, there were 692 households established north of the ramparts, by Ukrainians and Belarusians abducted from their hometowns in the course of the Russo-Polish War (1654–1667). These new outskirts of the city came to be known as the Meshchanskaya sloboda, after Ruthenian meshchane "town people". The term meshchane (мещане) acquired pejorative connotations in 18th-century Russia and today means "petty bourgeois" or "narrow-minded philistine".

The entire city of the late 17th century, including the slobodas that grew up outside the city ramparts, are contained within what is today Moscow's Central Administrative Okrug.

Numerous disasters befell the city. The plague epidemics ravaged Moscow in 1570–1571, 1592 and 1654–1656. The plague killed upwards of 80% of the people in 1654–55. Fires burned out much of the wooden city in 1626 and 1648.
In 1712 Peter the Great moved his government to the newly built Saint Petersburg on the Baltic coast. Moscow ceased to be Russia's capital, except for a brief period from 1728 to 1732 under the influence of the Supreme Privy Council.

Empire (1721–1917)

After losing the status as the capital of the empire, the population of Moscow at first decreased, from 200,000 in the 17th century to 130,000 in 1750. But after 1750, the population grew more than tenfold over the remaining duration of the Russian Empire, reaching 1.8 million by 1915. The 1770–1772 Russian plague killed up to 100,000 people in Moscow.

By 1700, the building of cobbled roads had begun. In November 1730, the permanent street light was introduced, and by 1867 many streets had a gaslight. In 1883, near the Prechistinskiye Gates, arc lamps were installed. Its line is traced today by a number of streets called val (“ramparts”).
Between 1781 and 1804 the Mytischinskiy water pipe (the first in Russia) was built. In 1813, following the destruction of much of the city during the French occupation, a Commission for the Construction of the City of Moscow was established. It launched a great program of rebuilding, including a partial replanning of the city-centre. Among many buildings constructed or reconstructed at this time was the Grand Kremlin Palace and the Kremlin Armoury, the Moscow University, the Moscow Manege (Riding School), and the Bolshoi Theatre. In 1903 the Moskvoretskaya water supply was completed.

In the early 19th century, the Arch of Konstantino-Elenensky gate was paved with bricks, but the Spassky Gate was the main front gate of the Kremlin and used for royal entrances. From this gate, wooden and (following the 17th-century improvements) stone bridges stretched across the moat. Books were sold on this bridge and stone platforms were built nearby for guns – "raskats". The Tsar Cannon was located on the platform of the Lobnoye mesto.

The road connecting Moscow with St. Petersburg, now the M10 highway, was completed in 1746, its Moscow end following the old Tver road, which had existed since the 16th century. It became known as Peterburskoye Schosse after it was paved in the 1780s. Petrovsky Palace was built in 1776–1780 by Matvey Kazakov.

When Napoleon invaded Russia in 1812, the Moscovites were evacuated. It is suspected that the Moscow fire was principally the effect of Russian sabotage. Napoleon's Grande Armée was forced to retreat and was nearly annihilated by the devastating Russian winter and sporadic attacks by Russian military forces. As many as 400,000 of Napoleon's soldiers died during this time.

Moscow State University was established in 1755. Its main building was reconstructed after the 1812 fire by Domenico Giliardi. The Moskovskiye Vedomosti newspaper appeared from 1756, originally in weekly intervals, and from 1859 as a daily newspaper.

The Arbat Street had been in existence since at least the 15th century, but it was developed into a prestigious area during the 18th century. It was destroyed in the fire of 1812 and was rebuilt completely in the early 19th century.

In the 1830s, general Alexander Bashilov planned the first regular grid of city streets north from Petrovsky Palace. Khodynka field south of the highway was used for military training. Smolensky Rail station (forerunner of present-day Belorussky Rail Terminal) was inaugurated in 1870. Sokolniki Park, in the 18th century the home of the tsar's falconers well outside Moscow, became contiguous with the expanding city in the later 19th century and was developed into a public municipal park in 1878. The suburban Savyolovsky Rail Terminal was built in 1902. In January 1905, the institution of the City Governor, or Mayor, was officially introduced in Moscow, and Alexander Adrianov became Moscow's first official mayor.

When Catherine II came to power in 1762, the city's filth and the smell of sewage were depicted by observers as a symptom of disorderly lifestyles of lower-class Russians recently arrived from the farms. Elites called for improving sanitation, which became part of Catherine's plans for increasing control over social life. National political and military successes from 1812 through 1855 calmed the critics and validated efforts to produce a more enlightened and stable society. There was less talk about the smell and the poor conditions of public health. However, in the wake of Russia's failures in the Crimean War in 1855–56, confidence in the ability of the state to maintain order in the slums eroded, and demands for improved public health put filth back on the agenda.

Soviet period (1917–1991)

In November 1917, upon learning of the uprising happening in Petrograd, Moscow's Bolsheviks also began their uprising. On November 2 (15), 1917, after heavy fighting, Soviet power was established in Moscow.

Then Vladimir Lenin, fearing possible foreign invasion, moved the capital from Petrograd (Saint Petersburg) back to Moscow on March 12, 1918. The Kremlin once again became the seat of power and the political centre of the new state.

With the change in values imposed by communist ideology, the tradition of preservation of cultural heritage was broken. Independent preservation societies, even those that defended only secular landmarks such as Moscow-based OIRU were disbanded by the end of the 1920s. A new anti-religious campaign, launched in 1929, coincided with the collectivization of peasants; the destruction of churches in the cities peaked around 1932. In 1937 several letters were written to the Central Committee of the Communist Party of the Soviet Union to rename Moscow to "Stalindar" or "Stalinodar," one from an elderly pensioner whose dream was to "live in Stalinodar" and had selected the name to represent the "gift" (dar) of the genius of Stalin. Stalin rejected this suggestion, and after it was suggested again to him by Nikolai Yezhov, he was outraged, saying "What do I need this for?". This was following Stalin banning the renaming of places in his name in 1936.

During World War II, the Soviet State Committee of Defence and the General Staff of the Red Army were located in Moscow. In 1941, 16 divisions of the national volunteers (more than 160,000 people), 25 battalions (18,000 people), and four engineering regiments were formed among the Muscovites. Between October 1941 and January 1942, the German Army Group Centre was stopped at the outskirts of the city and then driven off in the course of the Battle of Moscow. Many factories were evacuated, together with much of the government, and from October 20 the city was declared to be in a state of siege. Its remaining inhabitants built and manned antitank defenses, while the city was bombarded from the air. On May 1, 1944, a medal "For the defence of Moscow" and in 1947 another medal "In memory of the 800th anniversary of Moscow" was instituted.

Both German and Soviet casualties during the Battle of Moscow have been a subject of debate, as various sources provide somewhat different estimates. Total casualties between September 30, 1941, and January 7, 1942, are estimated to be between 248,000 and 400,000 for the Wehrmacht and between 650,000 and 1,280,000 for the Red Army.

During the postwar years, there was a serious housing crisis, solved by the invention of high-rise apartments. There are over 11,000 of these standardised and prefabricated apartment blocks, housing the majority of Moscow's population, making it by far the city with the most high-rise buildings. Apartments were built and partly furnished in the factory before being raised and stacked into tall columns. The popular Soviet-era comic film Irony of Fate parodies this construction method.

Moscow State University moved to its campus on Sparrow Hills in 1953.

In 1959 Nikita Khrushchev launched his anti-religious campaign. By 1964 over 10 thousand churches out of 20 thousand were shut down (mostly in rural areas) and many were demolished. Of 58 monasteries and convents operating in 1959, only sixteen remained by 1964; of Moscow's fifty churches operating in 1959, thirty were closed and six demolished.

On May 8, 1965, due to the actual 20th anniversary of the victory in World War II, Moscow was awarded a title of the Hero City.

The Moscow Ring Road (MKAD) was opened in 1961. It had four lanes running  along the city borders. The MKAD marked the administrative boundaries of the city of Moscow until the 1980s when outlying suburbs beyond the ring road began to be incorporated. In 1980, Moscow hosted the Summer Olympic Games, which were boycotted by the United States and several other Western countries due to the Soviet Union's involvement in Afghanistan in late 1979. In 1991 Moscow was the scene of a coup attempt by conservative communists opposed to the liberal reforms of Mikhail Gorbachev.

Recent history (1991–present)

When the USSR was dissolved in the same year, Moscow remained the capital of the Russian SFSR (on December 25, 1991, the Russian SFSR was renamed the Russian Federation). Since then, a market economy has emerged in Moscow, producing an explosion of Western-style retailing, services, architecture, and lifestyles.

The city has continued to grow during the 1990s to 2000s, its population rising from below nine to above ten million. Mason and Nigmatullina argue that Soviet-era urban-growth controls (before 1991) produced controlled and sustainable metropolitan development, typified by the greenbelt built in 1935. Since then, however, there has been a dramatic growth of low-density suburban sprawl, created by heavy demand for single-family dwellings as opposed to crowded apartments. In 1995–1997 the MKAD ring road was widened from the initial four to ten lanes.

In December 2002 Bulvar Dmitriya Donskogo became the first Moscow Metro station that opened beyond the limits of MKAD. The Third Ring Road, intermediate between the early 19th-century Garden Ring and the Soviet-era outer ring road, was completed in 2004. The greenbelt is becoming more and more fragmented, and satellite cities are appearing at the fringe. Summer dachas are being converted into year-round residences, and with the proliferation of automobiles there is heavy traffic congestion. Multiple old churches and other examples of architectural heritage that had been demolished during the Stalin era have been restored, such as the Cathedral of Christ the Saviour.
In 2010s Moscow's Administration has launched some long duration projects like the Moja Ulitsa (in English: My Street) urban redevelopment program or the Residency renovation one.

The annexed territory was officially named Новая Москва (New Moscow).

Geography

Location

Moscow is situated on the banks of the Moskva River, which flows for just over  through the East European Plain in central Russia, not far from the natural border of the forest and forest-steppe zone. 49 bridges span the river and its canals within the city's limits.

Time

Moscow serves as the reference point for the time zone used in most of European Russia, Belarus and the Republic of Crimea. The areas operate in what is referred to in international standards as Moscow Standard Time (MSK), which is 3 hours ahead of UTC, or UTC+3. Daylight saving time is no longer observed. According to the geographical longitude the average solar noon in Moscow occurs at 12:30.

Climate

Moscow has a humid continental climate (Köppen: Dfb) with long, cold (although average by Russian standards) winters usually lasting from mid-November to the end of March, and warm summers. More extreme continental climates at the same latitude- such as parts of Eastern Canada or Siberia- have much colder winters than Moscow, suggesting that there is still significant moderation from the Atlantic Ocean despite the fact that Moscow is far from the sea.

Typical high temperatures in the warm months of June, July, and August are around a comfortable , but during heat waves (which can occur between May and September), daytime high temperatures often exceed , sometimes for a week or two at a time. These periods usually last about a week or two. The growing season in Moscow normally lasts for 156 days usually around May 1 to October 5.

Record high and average temperatures were recorded for January, March, April, May, June, July, August, November, and December in 2007–2022. Snow, which is present for about five months a year, often begins to fall mid-October, while snow cover lies in November and melts at the beginning of April.

On average, Moscow has 1731 hours of sunshine per year, varying from a low of 8% in December to 52% from May to August. This large annual variation is due to convective cloud formation. In the winter, moist air from the Atlantic condenses in the cold continental interior, resulting in very overcast conditions. However, this same continental influence results in considerably sunnier summers than oceanic cities of similar latitude such as Edinburgh. Between 2004 and 2010, the average was between 1800 and 2000 hours with a tendency to more sunshine in summer months, up to a record 411 hours in July 2014, 79% of possible sunshine. December 2017 was the darkest month in Moscow since records began, with only six minutes of sunlight.

Temperatures in the centre of Moscow are often significantly higher than in the outskirts and nearby suburbs, especially in winter.

Recent changes in Moscow's regional climate, since it is in the mid-latitudes of the northern hemisphere, are often cited by climate scientists as evidence of global warming, though by definition, climate change is global, not regional. During the summer, extreme heat is often observed in the city (2001, 2002, 2003, 2010, 2011, 2021). Along with a southern part of Central Russia, after recent years of hot summer seasons, the climate of the city gets hot-summer classification trends. At the end of January–February it is often colder, with frosts reaching  a few nights per year (2006, 2010, 2011, 2012, and 2013).

The last decade was the warmest in the history of meteorological observations of Moscow. Temperature changes in the city are depicted in the table below:

Demographics

Population

According to the results of the 2021 Census, the population of Moscow was 13,010,112; up from 11,503,501 recorded in the 2010 Census.

Ethnic groups

Notes

 668,409 people were registered from administrative databases, and could not declare an ethnicity. It is estimated that the proportion of ethnicities in this group is the same as that of the declared group.

Vital statistics
The official population of Moscow is based on those holding "permanent residency". According to Russia's Federal Migration Service, Moscow holds 1.8 million official "guests" who have temporary residency on the basis of visas or other documentation, giving a legal population of 13.3 million. The number of Illegal immigrants, the vast majority originating from Central Asia, is estimated to be an additional 1 million people, giving a total population of about 14.3 million.

Total fertility rate:
 2010 - 1.25
 2014 - 1.34
 2015 - 1.41
 2016 - 1.46
 2017 - 1.38
 2018 - 1.41
 2019 - 1.50
 2020 - 1.47
 Births (2016): 145,252 (11.8 per 1000)
 Deaths (2016): 123,623 (10.0 per 1000)

Religion

Christians form the majority of the city's population; most of whom adhere Russian Orthodox Church. The Patriarch of Moscow serves as the head of the church and resides in the Danilov Monastery. Moscow was called the "city of 40 times 40 churches"—prior to 1917. Moscow is Russia's capital of Eastern Orthodox Christianity, which has been the country's traditional religion.

Other religions practiced in Moscow include Buddhism, Hinduism, Islam, Judaism, Yazidism, and Rodnovery. The Moscow Mufti Council claimed that Muslims numbered around 1.5 million of 10.5 million of the city's population in 2010; There are four mosques in the city.

Cityscape

Architecture

Moscow's architecture is world-renowned. Moscow is the site of Saint Basil's Cathedral, with its elegant onion domes, as well as the Cathedral of Christ the Savior and the Seven Sisters. The first Kremlin was built in the middle of the 12th century.

Medieval Moscow's design was of concentric walls and intersecting radial thoroughfares. This layout, as well as Moscow's rivers, helped shape Moscow's design in subsequent centuries.

The Kremlin was rebuilt in the 15th century. Its towers and some of its churches were built by Italian architects, lending the city some of the aurae of the renaissance. From the end of the 15th century, the city was embellished by masonry structures such as monasteries, palaces, walls, towers, and churches.

The city's appearance had not changed much by the 18th century. Houses were made of pine and spruce logs, with shingled roofs plastered with sod or covered by birch bark. The rebuilding of Moscow in the second half of the 18th century was necessitated by constant fires and the needs of the nobility. Much of the wooden city was replaced by buildings in the classical style.

For much of its architectural history, Moscow was dominated by Orthodox churches. However, the overall appearance of the city changed drastically during Soviet times, especially as a result of Joseph Stalin's large-scale effort to "modernize" Moscow. Stalin's plans for the city included a network of broad avenues and roadways, some of them over ten lanes wide, which, while greatly simplifying movement through the city, were constructed at the expense of a great number of historical buildings and districts. Among the many casualties of Stalin's demolitions was the Sukharev Tower, a longtime city landmark, as well as mansions and commercial buildings The city's newfound status as the capital of a deeply secular nation, made religiously significant buildings especially vulnerable to demolition. Many of the city's churches, which in most cases were some of Moscow's oldest and most prominent buildings, were destroyed; some notable examples include the Kazan Cathedral and the Cathedral of Christ the Savior. During the 1990s, both were rebuilt. Many smaller churches, however, were lost.

While the later Stalinist period was characterized by the curtailing of creativity and architectural innovation, the earlier post-revolutionary years saw a plethora of radical new buildings created in the city. Especially notable were the constructivist architects associated with VKHUTEMAS, responsible for such landmarks as Lenin's Mausoleum. Another prominent architect was Vladimir Shukhov, famous for Shukhov Tower, just one of many hyperboloid towers designed by Shukhov. It was built between 1919 and 1922 as a transmission tower for a Russian broadcasting company. Shukhov also left a lasting legacy to the Constructivist architecture of early Soviet Russia. He designed spacious elongated shop galleries, most notably the GUM department store on Red Square, bridged with innovative metal-and-glass vaults.

Perhaps the most recognizable contributions of the Stalinist period are the so-called Seven Sisters, seven massive skyscrapers scattered throughout the city at about an equal distance from the Kremlin. A defining feature of Moscow's skyline, their imposing form was allegedly inspired by the Manhattan Municipal Building in New York City, and their style—with intricate exteriors and a large central spire—has been described as Stalinist Gothic architecture. All seven towers can be seen from most high points in the city; they are among the tallest constructions in central Moscow apart from the Ostankino Tower, which, when it was completed in 1967, was the highest free-standing land structure in the world and today remains the world's seventy-second tallest, ranking among buildings such as the Burj Khalifa in Dubai, Taipei 101 in Taiwan and the CN Tower in Toronto.

The Soviet goal of providing housing for every family, and the rapid growth of Moscow's population, led to the construction of large, monotonous housing blocks. Most of these date from the post-Stalin era and the styles are often named after the leader then in power (Brezhnev, Khrushchev, etc.). They are usually badly maintained.

Although the city still has some five-story apartment buildings constructed before the mid-1960s, more recent apartment buildings are usually at least nine floors tall, and have elevators. It is estimated that Moscow has over twice as many elevators as New York City and four times as many as Chicago. Moslift, one of the city's major elevator operating companies, has about 1500 elevator mechanics on call, to release residents trapped in elevators.

Stalinist-era buildings, mostly found in the central part of the city, are massive and usually ornamented with Socialist realism motifs that imitate classical themes. However, small churches—almost always Eastern Orthodox– found across the city provide glimpses of its past. The Old Arbat Street, a tourist street that was once the heart of a bohemian area, preserves most of its buildings from prior to the 20th century. Many buildings found off the main streets of the inner city (behind the Stalinist façades of Tverskaya Street, for example) are also examples of bourgeois architecture typical of Tsarist times. Ostankino Palace, Kuskovo, Uzkoye and other large estates just outside Moscow originally belong to nobles from the Tsarist era, and some convents, and monasteries, both inside and outside the city, are open to Muscovites and tourists.

Attempts are being made to restore many of the city's best-kept examples of pre-Soviet architecture. These restored structures are easily spotted by their bright new colors and spotless façades. There are a few examples of notable, early Soviet avant-garde work too, such as the house of the architect Konstantin Melnikov in the Arbat area. Many of these restorations were criticized for alleged disrespect of historical authenticity. Facadism is also widely practiced. Later examples of interesting Soviet architecture are usually marked by their impressive size and the semi-Modernist styles employed, such as with the Novy Arbat project, familiarly known as "false teeth of Moscow" and notorious for the wide-scale disruption of a historic area in central Moscow involved in the project.

Plaques on house exteriors will inform passers-by that a well-known personality once lived there. Frequently, the plaques are dedicated to Soviet celebrities not well known outside (or often, like with decorated generals and revolutionaries, now both inside) of Russia. There are also many "museum houses" of famous Russian writers, composers, and artists in the city.

Moscow's skyline is quickly modernizing, with several new towers under construction.
In recent years, the city administration has been widely criticized for heavy destruction that has affected many historical buildings. As much as a third of historic Moscow has been destroyed in the past few years to make space for luxury apartments and hotels. Other historical buildings, including such landmarks as the 1930 Moskva hotel and the 1913 department store Voyentorg, have been razed and reconstructed anew, with the inevitable loss of historical value. Critics blame the government for not enforcing conservation laws: in the last 12 years, more than 50 buildings with monument status were torn down, several of those dating back to the 17th century. Some critics also wonder if the money used for the reconstruction of razed buildings could not be used for the renovation of decaying structures, which include many works by architect Konstantin Melnikov and Mayakovskaya metro station.

Some organizations, such as Moscow Architecture Preservation Society and Save Europe's Heritage, are trying to draw the international public attention to these problems.

Parks and landmarks

There are 96 parks and 18 gardens in Moscow, including four botanical gardens. Moscow is a very green city, if compared to other cities of comparable size in Western Europe and North America; this is partly due to a history of having green "yards" with trees and grass, between residential buildings. There are on average  of parks per person in Moscow compared with 6 for Paris, 7.5 in London and 8.6 in New York.

Gorky Park (officially the Central Park of Culture and Rest named after Maxim Gorky), was founded in 1928. The main part along the Moskva river contains estrades, children's attractions (including the Observation Wheel water ponds with boats and water bicycles), dancing, tennis courts and other sports facilities. It borders the Neskuchny Garden, the oldest park in Moscow and a former imperial residence, created as a result of the integration of three estates in the 18th century. The Garden features the Green Theater, one of the largest open amphitheaters in Europe, able to hold up to 15 thousand people. Several parks include a section known as a "Park of Culture and Rest", sometimes alongside a much wilder area (this includes parks such as Izmaylovsky, Fili and Sokolniki). Some parks are designated as Forest Parks (lesopark).

Izmaylovsky Park, created in 1931, is one of the largest urban parks in the world along with Richmond Park in London.

Bauman  Garden, officially founded in 1920 and renamed in 1922 after the bolshevik  Nikolay Bauman, is one of the oldest parks in Moscow. It is standing on the site of the former Golitsyn estate and eighteenth-century public garden. 

A central circle with a large fountain is surrounded by birch, maple, and elm tree alleys. A labyrinth composed of green paths lies beyond the park's ponds.

It is quite wild, and is also known as the "city taiga" – elk can be seen there.

Tsytsin Main Botanical Garden of Academy of Sciences, founded in 1945 is the largest in Europe. It covers the territory of  bordering the All-Russia Exhibition Center and contains a live exhibition of more than 20 thousand species of plants from around the world, as well as a lab for scientific research. It contains a rosarium with 20 thousand rose bushes, a dendrarium, and an oak forest, with the average age of trees exceeding 100 years.

The All-Russian Exhibition Center (Всероссийский выставочный центр), formerly known as the All-Union Agricultural Exhibition (VSKhV) and later Exhibition of Achievements of the National Economy (VDNKh), though officially named a "permanent trade show", is one of the most prominent examples of Stalinist-era monumental architecture. Among the large spans of a recreational park, areas are scores of elaborate pavilions, each representing either a branch of Soviet industry and science or a USSR republic. Even though during the 1990s it was, and for some part still is, misused as a gigantic shopping center (most of the pavilions are rented out for small businesses), it still retains the bulk of its architectural landmarks, including two monumental fountains (Stone Flower and Friendship of Nations) and a 360 degrees panoramic cinema. In 2014 the park returned to the name Exhibition of Achievements of National Economy, and in the same year, huge renovation works had been started.

Lilac Park, founded in 1958, has a permanent sculpture display and a large rosarium. Moscow has always been a popular destination for tourists. Some of the more famous attractions include the city's UNESCO World Heritage Site, Moscow Kremlin and Red Square, which was built between the 14th and 17th centuries. The Church of the Ascension at Kolomenskoye, which dates from 1532, is also a UNESCO World Heritage Site and another popular attraction.

Near the new Tretyakov Gallery there is a sculpture garden, Museon, often called "the graveyard of fallen monuments" that displays statues of the former Soviet Union that were removed from their place after its dissolution.

Other attractions include the Moscow Zoo, a zoological garden in two sections (the valleys of two streams) linked by a bridge, with nearly a thousand species and more than 6,500 specimens. Each year, the zoo attracts more than 1.2 million visitors. Many of Moscow's parks and landscaped gardens are protected natural environments.

Moscow rings 
Moscow's road system is centered roughly on the Kremlin at the heart of the city. From there, roads generally span outwards to intersect with a sequence of circular roads ("rings").

 The first and innermost major ring, Bulvarnoye Koltso (Boulevard Ring), was built at the former location of the 16th-century city wall around what used to be called Bely Gorod (White Town). The Bulvarnoye Koltso is technically not a ring; it does not form a complete circle, but instead a horseshoe-shaped arc that begins at the Cathedral of Christ the Savior and ends at the Yauza River.
 The second primary ring, located outside the Boulevard Ring, is the Sadovoye Koltso (Garden Ring). Like the Boulevard Ring, the Garden Ring follows the path of a 16th-century wall that used to encompass part of Moscow. 
 The Third Ring Road, was completed in 2003 as a high-speed freeway.
 The Fourth Transport Ring, another freeway, was planned, but cancelled in 2011. A system of chordal highways will replace it.

Aside from the aforementioned hierarchy, line 5 of Moscow Metro is a circle-shaped looped subway line (hence the name Koltsevaya Liniya, literally "ring line"), which is located between the Sadovoye Koltso and Third Transport Ring.

Two modern overlapping lines of Moscow Metro form "two hearts":
 Line 14. Since September 10, 2016, Moscow Central Circle renovated railroad (former Moskovskaya Okruzhnaya Zheleznaya Doroga) was introduced as Line 14 of Moscow Metro. The cone-shaped railroad initially opened in 1908 (freight-only railway from 1934 until the 2016 reopening).
 Line 11. Another circle metro line - Big Circle Line (Bolshaya Koltsevaya Liniya) is under construction and will be finished in 2023. Kakhovskaya-Savyolovskaya western half of the line was launched in late 2021.

The outermost ring within Moscow is the Moscow Ring Road (often called MKAD, acronym word for Russian Московская Кольцевая Автомобильная Дорога), which forms the cultural boundary of the city, and was established in the 1950s. It is to note the method of building the road (usage of ground elevation instead of concrete columns throughout the whole way) formed a wall-like barrier that obstacles building roads under the MKAD highway itself).
 Before 2012 expansion of Moscow, MKAD was considered an approximate border for Moscow boundaries.

Outside Moscow, some of the roads encompassing the city continue to follow this circular pattern seen inside city limits, with the notable examples of Betonka roads (highways A107 and A108), originally made of concrete pads.

In order to reduce transit traffic on MKAD, the new ring road (called CKAD - Centralnaya Koltsevaya Avtomobilnaya Doroga, Central Ring Road) is now under construction beyond the MKAD.

Transport rings in Moscow

Culture

Museums and galleries
One of the most notable art museums in Moscow is the Tretyakov Gallery, which was founded by Pavel Tretyakov, a wealthy patron of the arts who donated a large private collection to the city. The Tretyakov Gallery is split into two buildings. The Old Tretyakov gallery, the original gallery in the Tretyakovskaya area on the south bank of the Moskva River, houses works in the classic Russian tradition. The works of famous pre-Revolutionary painters, such as Ilya Repin, as well as the works of early Russian icon painters can be found here. Visitors can even see rare originals by early 15th-century iconographer Andrei Rublev.
The New Tretyakov gallery, created in Soviet times, mainly contains the works of Soviet artists, as well as of a few contemporary paintings, but there is some overlap with the Old Tretyakov Gallery for early 20th-century art. The new gallery includes a small reconstruction of Vladimir Tatlin's famous Monument to the Third International and a mixture of other avant-garde works by artists like Kazimir Malevich and Wassily Kandinsky. Socialist realism features can also be found within the halls of the New Tretyakov Gallery.

Another art museum in the city of Moscow is the Pushkin Museum of Fine Arts, which was founded by, among others, the father of Marina Tsvetaeva. The Pushkin Museum is similar to the British Museum in London in that its halls are a cross-section of exhibits on world civilisations, with many copies of ancient sculptures. However, it also hosts paintings from every major Western era; works by Claude Monet, Paul Cézanne, and Pablo Picasso are present in the museum's collection.

The State Historical Museum of Russia (Государственный Исторический музей) is a museum of Russian history located between Red Square and Manege Square in Moscow. Its exhibitions range from relics of the prehistoric tribes inhabiting present-day Russia, through priceless artworks acquired by members of the Romanov dynasty. The total number of objects in the museum's collection numbers is several million. The Polytechnical Museum, founded in 1872 is the largest technical museum in Russia, offering a wide array of historical inventions and technological achievements, including humanoid automata from the 18th century and the first Soviet computers. Its collection contains more than 160,000 items. The Borodino Panorama museum located on Kutuzov Avenue provides an opportunity for visitors to experience being on a battlefield with a 360° diorama. It is a part of the large historical memorial commemorating the victory in the Patriotic War of 1812 over Napoleon's army, that includes also the triumphal arch, erected in 1827. There is also a military history museum that includes statues, and military hardware.
Memorial Museum of Cosmonautics under the Monument to the Conquerors of Space at the end of Cosmonauts Alley is the central memorial place for the Russian space officials.

The Shchusev State Museum of Architecture is the national museum of Russian architecture by the name of the architect Alexey Shchusev near the Kremlin area.

Moscow will get its own branch of the Hermitage Museum in 2024, with authorities having agreed upon the final project, to be executed by Hani Rashid, co-founder of New York-based 'Asymptote Architecture' - the same bureau that's behind the city's stock market building, the Busan-based World Business Center Solomon Tower and the Strata Tower in Abu-Dhabi.

Performing arts
Moscow is the heart of the Russian performing arts, including ballet and film, with 68 museums 103 theaters, 132 cinemas and 24 concert halls. Among Moscow's theaters and ballet studios is the Bolshoi Theatre and the Malyi Theatre as well as Vakhtangov Theatre and Moscow Art Theatre.

The Moscow International Performance Arts Center, opened in 2003, also known as Moscow International House of Music, is known for its performances in classical music. It has the largest organ in Russia installed in Svetlanov Hall.

There are also two large circuses in Moscow: Moscow State Circus and Moscow Circus on Tsvetnoy Boulevard named after Yuri Nikulin.

The Mosfilm studio was at the heart of many classic films, as it is responsible for both artistic and mainstream productions. However, despite the continued presence and reputation of internationally renowned Russian filmmakers, the once prolific native studios are much quieter. Rare and historical films may be seen in the Salut cinema, where films from the Museum of Cinema collection are shown regularly. International film festivals such as the Moscow International Film Festival, Stalker, Artdocfest, and Moscow Jewish Film Festival are staged in Moscow.

Sports

Over 500 Olympic sports champions lived in the city by 2005. Moscow is home to 63 stadiums (besides eight football and eleven light athletics maneges), of which Luzhniki Stadium is the largest and the 4th biggest in Europe (it hosted the 1998–99 UEFA Cup, 2007–08 UEFA Champions League finals, the 1980 Summer Olympics, and the 2018 FIFA World Cup with 7 games total, including the final). Forty other sports complexes are located within the city, including 24 with artificial ice. The Olympic Stadium was the world's first indoor arena for bandy and hosted the Bandy World Championship twice. Moscow was again the host of the competition in 2010, this time in Krylatskoye. That arena has also hosted the World Speed Skating Championships. There are also seven horse racing tracks in Moscow, of which Central Moscow Hippodrome, founded in 1834, is the largest.

Moscow was the host city of the 1980 Summer Olympics, with the yachting events being held at Tallinn, in present-day Estonia. Large sports facilities and the main international airport, Sheremetyevo Terminal 2, were built in preparation for the 1980 Summer Olympics. Moscow had made a bid for the 2012 Summer Olympics. However, when final voting commenced on July 6, 2005, Moscow was the first city to be eliminated from further rounds. The Games were awarded to London.

The most titled ice hockey team in the Soviet Union and in the world, HC CSKA Moscow comes from Moscow. Other big ice hockey clubs from Moscow are HC Dynamo Moscow, which was the second most titled team in the Soviet Union, and HC Spartak Moscow.

The most titled Soviet, Russian, and one of the most titled Euroleague clubs, is the basketball club from Moscow PBC CSKA Moscow. Moscow hosted the EuroBasket in 1953 and 1965.

Moscow had more winners at the USSR and Russian Chess Championship than any other city.

The most titled volleyball team in the Soviet Union and in Europe (CEV Champions League) is VC CSKA Moscow.

In football, FC Spartak Moscow has won more championship titles in the Russian Premier League than any other team. They were second only to FC Dynamo Kyiv in Soviet times. PFC CSKA Moscow became the first Russian football team to win a UEFA title, the UEFA Cup (present-day UEFA Europa League). FC Lokomotiv Moscow, FC Dynamo Moscow and FC Torpedo Moscow are other professional football teams also based in Moscow.

Moscow houses other prominent football, ice hockey, and basketball teams. Because sports organisations in the Soviet Union were once highly centralized, two of the best Union-level teams represented defence and law-enforcing agencies: the Armed Forces (CSKA) and the Ministry of Internal Affairs (Dinamo). There were army and police teams in most major cities. As a result, Spartak, CSKA, and Dinamo were among the best-funded teams in the USSR.

The Irina Viner-Usmanova Gymnastics Palace is located in the Luzniki Olympic Complex. The building works started in 2017 and the opening ceremony took place on June 18, 2019. The investor of the Palace is the billionaire Alisher Usmanov, husband of the former gymnast and gymnastics coach Irina Viner-Usmanova. The total surface of the building is 23,500 m2, which include 3 fitness rooms, locker rooms, rooms reserved for referees and coaches, saunas, a canteen, a cafeteria, 2 ball halls, a Medical center, a hall reserved for journalists, and a hotel for athletes.

Because of Moscow's cold local climate, winter sports have a following. Many of Moscow's large parks offer marked trails for skiing and frozen ponds for skating.

Moscow hosts the annual Kremlin Cup, a popular tennis tournament on both the WTA and ATP tours. It is one of the ten Tier-I events on the women's tour and a host of Russian players feature every year.

SC Olimpiyskiy hosted the Eurovision Song Contest 2009, the first and so far the only Eurovision Song Contest arranged in Russia.

Slava Moscow is a professional rugby club, competing in the national Professional Rugby League. Former rugby league heavyweights RC Lokomotiv have entered the same league . The Luzhniki Stadium also hosted the 2013 Rugby World Cup Sevens.

In bandy, one of the most successful clubs in the world is 20 times Russian League champions Dynamo Moscow. They have also won the World Cup thrice and European Cup six times.

MFK Dinamo Moskva is one of the major futsal clubs in Europe, having won the Futsal Champions League title once.

When Russia was selected to host the 2018 FIFA World Cup, the Luzhniki Stadium got an increased capacity, by almost 10,000 new seats, in addition to a further two stadiums that have been built: the Dynamo Stadium, and the Spartak Stadium, although the first one later was dismissed from having World Cup matches.

Football clubs

Entertainment

The city is full of clubs, restaurants, and bars. Tverskaya Street is also one of the busiest shopping streets in Moscow.

The adjoining Tretyakovsky Proyezd, also south of Tverskaya Street, in Kitai-gorod, is host to upmarket boutique stores such as Bulgari, Tiffany & Co., Armani, Prada and Bentley. Nightlife in Moscow has moved on since Soviet times and today the city has many of the world's largest nightclubs. Clubs, bars, creative spaces and restaurants-turned-into-dancefloors are flooding Moscow streets with new openings every year. The hottest area is located around the old chocolate factory, where bars, nightclubs, galleries, cafés and restaurants are placed.

Dream Island is an amusement park in Moscow that opened on February 29, 2020. It is the largest indoor theme park in Europe.
The park covers 300,000 square meters. During the park's construction, 150 acres of nature trees unique and rare animals and birds and plants on the peninsula were destroyed. The appearance is in the style of a fairytale castle similar to Disneyland. The park has 29 unique attractions with many rides, as well as pedestrian malls with fountains and cycle paths. The complex includes a landscaped park along with a concert hall, a cinema, a hotel, a children's sailing school, restaurants, and shops.

Authorities

Moscow authorities

According to the Constitution of the Russian Federation, Moscow is an independent federal subject of the Russian Federation, the so-called city of federal importance.

The Mayor of Moscow is the leading official in the executive, leading the Government of Moscow, which is the highest organ of executive power.
The Moscow City Duma is the City Duma (city council or local parliament) and local laws must be approved by it. It includes 45 members who are elected for a five-year term on Single-mandate constituency basis.

From 2006 to 2012, direct elections of the mayor were not held due to changes in the Charter of the city of Moscow, the mayor was appointed by presidential decree. The first direct elections from the time of the 2003 vote were to be held after the expiration of the current mayor in 2015, however, in connection with his resignation of his own free will, they took place in September 2013.

Local administration is carried out through eleven prefectures, uniting the districts of Moscow into administrative districts on a territorial basis, and 125 regional administrations. According to the law "On the organization of local self-government in the city of Moscow", since the beginning of 2003, the executive bodies of local self-government are municipalities, representative bodies are municipal assemblies, whose members are elected in accordance with the Charter of the intracity municipality.

Federal authorities

In Moscow, as in a city endowed with the Constitution of the Russian Federation, the legislative, executive, and judicial federal authorities of the country are located, with the exception of the Constitutional Court of the Russian Federation, which has been located in Saint Petersburg since 2008.

The supreme executive authority - the Government of the Russian Federation - is located in the House of the Government of the Russian Federation on Krasnopresnenskaya Embankment in the center of Moscow. The State Duma sits on Okhotny Ryad. The Federation Council is located in a building on Bolshaya Dmitrovka. The Supreme Court of the Russian Federation and the Supreme Court of Arbitration of the Russian Federation are also located in Moscow.

In addition, the Moscow Kremlin is the official residence of the President of the Russian Federation. The president's working residence in the Kremlin is located in the Senate Palace.

Safety 

According to the ranking of the safest cities made by The Economist Moscow occupies the 37th position with a score of 68,5 points percent. The general level of crime is quite low. More than 170,000 surveillance cameras in Moscow are connected to the facial recognition system. The authorities recognized the successful two-month experiment with automatic recognition of faces, gender, and age of people in real-time - and then they deployed the system to the whole city. The network of video surveillance unites access video cameras (95% of residential apartment buildings in the capital), cameras in the territory and in buildings of schools and kindergartens, at the MCC stations, stadiums, public transport stops, and bus stations, in parks, underground passages.

The emergency numbers are the same as in all the other regions of Russia: 112 is the Single Emergency Number, 101 is the number of the Fire Service and Ministry of Emergency Situations, 102 is the Police one, 103 is the ambulance one, 104 is the Emergency Gas number. Moscow's EMS is the second most efficient one among the world's megacities, as reported by PwC during the presentation of the international study Analysis of EMS Efficiency in Megacities of the World.

Administrative divisions

The entire city of Moscow is headed by one mayor (Sergey Sobyanin). The city of Moscow is divided into twelve administrative okrugs and 125 districts.

The Russian capital's town-planning development began to show as early as the 12th century when the city was founded. The central part of Moscow grew by consolidating with suburbs in line with medieval principles of urban development when strong fortress walls would gradually spread along the circle streets of adjacent new settlements. The first circular defence walls set the trajectory of Moscow's rings, laying the groundwork for the future planning of the Russian capital.

The following fortifications served as the city's circular defense boundaries at some point in history: the Kremlin walls, Zemlyanoy Gorod (Earthwork Town), the Kamer-Kollezhsky Rampart, the Garden Ring, and the small railway ring. The Moscow Ring Road (MKAD) has been Moscow's boundary since 1960. Also in the form of a circle are the main Moscow subway line, the Ring Line, and the so-called Third Automobile Ring, which was completed in 2005. Hence, the characteristic radial-circle planning continues to define Moscow's further development. However, contemporary Moscow has also engulfed a number of territories outside the MKAD, such as Solntsevo, Butovo, and the town of Zelenograd. A part of Moscow Oblast's territory was merged into Moscow on July 1, 2012; as a result, Moscow is no longer fully surrounded by Moscow Oblast and now also has a border with Kaluga Oblast. Moscow's Mayor Sergey Sobyanin lauded the expansion that will help Moscow and the neighboring region, a "mega-city" of twenty million people, to develop "harmonically."

All administrative okrugs and districts have their own coats of arms and flags as well as individual heads of the area.

In addition to the districts, there are Territorial Units with Special Status. These usually include areas with small or no permanent populations. Such is the case with the All-Russia Exhibition Centre, the Botanical Garden, large parks, and industrial zones. In recent years, some territories have been merged with different districts. There are no ethnic-specific regions in Moscow, as in the Chinatowns that exist in some North American and East Asian cities. And although districts are not designated by income, as with most cities, those areas that are closer to the city center, metro stations or green zones are considered more prestigious.

Moscow also hosts some of the government bodies of Moscow Oblast, although the city itself is not a part of the oblast.

Economy

Overview

Moscow has one of the largest municipal economies in Europe and it accounts more than one-fifth of Russia's gross domestic product (GDP). , the GRP of Moscow reached almost ₽20 trillion(US$330 billion) and ₽1,567,645 per capita(~US$26,000). Gross Metropolitan Product(Moscow + Moscow Region) was ₽25 trillion or around US$400 billion.

The average gross monthly wage in the city is ₽123,688 (US$2,000), which is around twice the national average of ₽66,572 (US$1,000), and one of the highest among the federal subjects of Russia.

Moscow is home to the third-highest number of billionaires of any city in the world, and has the highest number of billionaires of any city in Europe. It is the financial center of Russia and home to the country's largest banks and many of its largest companies, such as oil giant Rosneft. Moscow accounts for 17% of retail sales in Russia and for 13% of all construction activity in the country. Since the 1998 Russian financial crisis, business sectors in Moscow have shown exponential rates of growth. Many new business centers and office buildings have been built in recent years, but Moscow still experiences shortages in office space. As a result, many former industrial and research facilities are being reconstructed to become suitable for office use. Overall, economic stability has improved in recent years; nonetheless, crime and corruption still hinder business development.

Industry
Primary industries in Moscow include the chemical, metallurgy, food, textile, furniture, energy production, software development and machinery industries.

The Mil Moscow Helicopter Plant is one of the world's leading producers of military and civil helicopters. Khrunichev State Research and Production Space Center produces various space equipment, including modules for space stations Mir, Salyut and the ISS as well as Proton launch vehicles and military ICBMs. Sukhoi, Ilyushin, Mikoyan, Tupolev and Yakovlev aircraft design bureaus also situated in Moscow. NPO Energomash, producing the rocket engines for Russian and American space programs, as well as Lavochkin design bureau, which built fighter planes during WWII, but switched to space probes since the Space Race, are in nearby Khimki, an independent city in Moscow Oblast that have largely been enclosed by Moscow from its sides. Automobile plants ZiL and AZLK, as well as the Voitovich Rail Vehicle plant, are situated in Moscow and Metrovagonmash metro wagon plant is located just outside the city limits. The Poljot Moscow watch factory produces military, professional and sport watches well known in Russia and abroad. Yuri Gagarin in his trip into space used "Shturmanskie" produced by this factory.

The Electrozavod factory was the first transformer factory in Russia. The Kristall distillery is the oldest distillery in Russia producing vodka types, including "Stolichnaya" while wines are produced at Moscow wine plants, including the Moscow Interrepublican Vinery. The Moscow Jewelry Factory and the Jewellerprom are producers of jewelry in Russia; Jewellerprom used to produce the exclusive Order of Victory, awarded to those aiding the Soviet Union's Red Army during World War II.

There are other industries located just outside the city of Moscow, as well as microelectronic industries in Zelenograd, including Ruselectronics companies.

Gazprom, the largest extractor of natural gas in the world and the largest Russian company, has head offices also in Moscow, as well as other oil, gas, and electricity companies.

Moscow hosts headquarters of the many of telecommunication and technology companies, including 1C, ABBYY, Beeline, Kaspersky Lab, Mail.Ru Group, MegaFon, MTS, Rambler&Co, Rostelecom, Yandex, and Yota.

Some industry is being transferred out of the city to improve the ecological state of the city.

Cost of living

During Soviet times, apartments were lent to people by the government according to the square meters-per-person norm (some groups, including people's artists, heroes, and prominent scientists had bonuses according to their honors). Private ownership of apartments was limited until the 1990s when people were permitted to secure property rights to their inhabited places. Since the Soviet era, estate owners have had to pay the service charge for their residences, a fixed amount based on persons per living area.

The price of real estate in Moscow continues to rise. Today, one could expect to pay $4,000 on average per square meter (11 sq ft) on the outskirts of the city or US$6,500–$8,000 per square meter in a prestigious district. The price sometimes may exceed US$40,000 per square meter in a flat. It costs about US$1,200 per month to rent a one-bedroom apartment and about US$1,000 per month for a studio in the center of Moscow.

Many cannot move out of their apartments, especially if a family lives in a two-room apartment originally granted by the state during the Soviet era. Some city residents have attempted to cope with the cost of living by renting their apartments while staying in dachas (country houses) outside the city.

In 2006, Mercer Human Resources Consulting named Moscow the world's most expensive city for expatriate employees, ahead of perennial winner Tokyo, due to the stable Russian ruble as well as increasing housing prices within the city. Moscow also ranked first in the 2007 edition and 2008 edition of the survey. However, Tokyo has overtaken Moscow as the most expensive city in the world, placing Moscow at third behind Osaka in second place.

In 2008, Moscow ranked top on the list of most expensive cities for the third year in a row.

In 2014, according to Forbes, Moscow was ranked the 9th most expensive city in the world. Forbes ranked Moscow the 2nd most expensive city the year prior.

In 2019 the Economist Intelligence Unit's Worldwide Cost of Living survey put Moscow to 102nd place in the biannual ranking of 133 most expensive cities. ECA International's Cost of Living 2019 Survey ranked Moscow at number 120 among 482 locations worldwide.

Public utilities

Heating
The heating of buildings in Moscow, like in other cities in Russia is done using central heating system. Before 2004, state unitary enterprises were responsible to produce and supply heat to the clients by the operation of heating stations and heating distribution system of Mosgorteplo, Mosteploenergo, and Teploremontnaladka which gave service to the heating substations in the north-eastern part of the city. Clients were divided between the various enterprises based on their geographical location. A major reform launched in 2004 consolidated the various companies under the umbrella of MIPC which became the municipal heat supplier. Its subsidiaries were the newly transformed Joint-stock companies. The city's main source of heating is the power station of Mosenergo which was reformed in 2005, when around ten subsidiaries were separated from it. One of the newly independent companies was the District Heating Network Company (MTK). In 2007 the Government of Moscow bought controlling stakes in the company.

City services
“Our city” is a geo-information portal created in 2011 under the mayor of Moscow Sergei Sobyanin with the aim of building a constructive dialogue between Moscow residents and the city's executive authorities. The portal is being developed by the State Public Institution “New Management Technologies” together with the Moscow Department of Information Technologies. In its 10 years of operation, more than 1.7 million users have joined the portal, and during this time it has become an effective tool for monitoring the state of urban infrastructure.

Education

There are 1,696 high schools in Moscow, as well as 91 colleges. Besides these, there are 222 institutions of higher education, including 60 state universities and the Lomonosov Moscow State University, which was founded in 1755. The university has over 30,000 undergraduate and 7,000 postgraduate students, who have a choice of twenty-nine faculties and 450 departments for study. Additionally, approximately 10,000 high school students take courses at the university, while over two thousand researchers work. The Moscow State University library contains over nine million books, making it one of the largest libraries in all of Russia. Its acclaim throughout the international academic community has meant that over 11,000 international students have graduated from the university, with many coming to Moscow to become fluent in the Russian language.

The I.M. Sechenov First Moscow State Medical University named after Ivan Sechenov or formerly known as Moscow Medical Academy (1stMSMU) is a medical university situated in Moscow, Russia. It was founded in 1785 as the faculty of the Moscow State University. It is a Russian Federal Agency for Health and Social Development. It is one of the largest medical universities in Russia and Europe. More than 9200 students are enrolled in 115 academic departments. It offers courses for post-graduate studies.

The Pirogov Russian National Research Medical University (formerly known as Russian State Medical University) is a medical higher education institution in Moscow, Russia founded in 1906. It is fully accredited and recognized by Russia's Ministry of Education and Science and is currently under the authority of the Ministry of Health and Social Development. Named after Russian surgeon and pedagogue N.I. Pirogov (1810-1888), it is one of the largest medical institutions and the first university in Russia to allow women to acquire degrees.

Moscow is one of the financial centers of the Russian Federation and CIS countries and is known for its business schools. Among them are the Financial University under the Government of the Russian Federation; Plekhanov Russian University of Economics; The State University of Management, and the National Research University - Higher School of Economics. They offer undergraduate degrees in management, finance, accounting, marketing, real estate, and economic theory, as well as Masters programs and MBAs. Most of them have branches in other regions of Russia and countries around the world.

Bauman Moscow State Technical University, founded in 1830, is located in the center of Moscow and provides 18,000 undergraduate and 1,000 postgraduate students with an education in science and engineering, offering technical degrees.

The Moscow Conservatory, founded in 1866, is a prominent music school in Russia whose graduates include Sergey Rachmaninoff, Alexander Scriabin, Aram Khachaturian, Mstislav Rostropovich, and Alfred Schnittke.

The Gerasimov All-Russian State Institute of Cinematography, abbreviated as VGIK, is the world's oldest educational institution in Cinematography, founded by Vladimir Gardin in 1919.
Sergei Eisenstein, Vsevolod Pudovkin, and Aleksey Batalov were among its most distinguished professors and Mikhail Vartanov, Sergei Parajanov, Andrei Tarkovsky, Nikita Mikhalkov, Eldar Ryazanov, Alexander Sokurov, Yuriy Norshteyn, Aleksandr Petrov, Vasily Shukshin, Konrad Wolf among graduates.

Moscow State Institute of International Relations, founded in 1944, remains Russia's best- known school of international relations and diplomacy, with six schools focused on international relations. Approximately 4,500 students make up the university's student body and over 700,000 Russian and foreign-language books—of which 20,000 are considered rare—can be found in the library of the Moscow State Institute of International Relations.

Other institutions are the Moscow Institute of Physics and Technology, also known as Phystech, the Fyodorov Eye Microsurgery Complex, founded in 1988 by Russian eye surgeon Svyatoslav Fyodorov, the Moscow Aviation Institute, the Moscow Motorway Institute (State Technical University), and the Moscow Engineering Physics Institute. Moscow Institute of Physics and Technology has taught numerous Nobel Prize winners, including Pyotr Kapitsa, Nikolay Semyonov, Lev Landau and Alexander Prokhorov, while the Moscow Engineering Physics Institute is known for its research in nuclear physics. The highest Russian military school is the Combined Arms Academy of the Armed Forces of the Russian Federation.

Although Moscow has a number of famous Soviet-era higher educational institutions, most of which are more oriented towards engineering or the fundamental sciences, in recent years Moscow has seen a growth in the number of commercial and private institutions that offer classes in business and management. Many state institutions have expanded their education scope and introduced new courses or departments. Institutions in Moscow, as well as the rest of post-Soviet Russia, have begun to offer new international certificates and postgraduate degrees, including the Master of Business Administration. Student exchange programs with numerous countries, specially with the rest of Europe, have also become widespread in Moscow's universities, while schools within the Russian capital also offer seminars, lectures, and courses for corporate employees and businessmen.

Moscow is one of the largest science centers in Russia. The headquarters of the Russian Academy of Sciences are located in Moscow as well as research and applied science institutions. The Kurchatov Institute, Russia's leading research and development institution in the fields of nuclear energy, where the first nuclear reactor in Europe was built, the Landau Institute for Theoretical Physics, Institute for Theoretical and Experimental Physics, Kapitza Institute for Physical Problems and Steklov Institute of Mathematics are all situated in Moscow.

There are 452 libraries in the city, including 168 for children. The Russian State Library, founded in 1862, is the national library of Russia. Items in 247 languages account for 29% of the collection.

The State Public Historical Library, founded in 1863, is the largest library specialising in Russian history. Its collection contains four million items in 112 languages (including 47 languages of the former USSR), mostly on Russian and world history, heraldry, numismatics, and the history of science.

In regard to primary and secondary education, in 2011, Clifford J. Levy of The New York Times wrote, "Moscow has some strong public schools, but the system as a whole is dispiriting, in part because it is being corroded by the corruption that is a post-Soviet scourge. Parents often pay bribes to get their children admitted to better public schools. There are additional payoffs for good grades."

Transportation

Metro

The Moscow Metro system is famous for its art, murals, mosaics, and ornate chandeliers. It started operation in 1935 and immediately became the centrepiece of the transportation system. More than that it was a Stalinist device to awe and reward the populace, and give them an appreciation of Soviet realist art. It became the prototype for future Soviet large-scale technologies. Lazar Kaganovich was in charge; he designed the subway so that citizens would absorb the values and ethos of Stalinist civilisation as they rode. The artwork of the 13 original stations became nationally and internationally famous. For example, the Sverdlov Square subway station featured porcelain bas-reliefs depicting the daily life of the Soviet peoples, and the bas-reliefs at the Dynamo Stadium sports complex glorified sports and the physical prowess of the powerful new "Homo Sovieticus" (Soviet man).

The metro was touted as the symbol of the new social order—a sort of Communist cathedral of engineering modernity. Soviet workers did the labour and the artwork, but the main engineering designs, routes, and construction plans were handled by specialists recruited from the London Underground. The Britons called for tunneling instead of the "cut-and-cover" technique, the use of escalators instead of lifts, and designed the routes and the rolling stock. The paranoia of Stalin and the NKVD was evident when the secret police arrested numerous British engineers for espionage—that is for gaining an in-depth knowledge of the city's physical layout. Engineers for the Metropolitan Vickers Electrical Company were given a show trial and deported in 1933, ending the role of British business in the USSR.

Today, the Moscow Metro comprises twelve lines, mostly underground with a total of 203 stations. The Metro is one of the deepest subway systems in the world; for instance, the Park Pobedy station, completed in 2003, at  underground, has the longest escalators in Europe. The Moscow Metro is the busiest metro system in Europe, as well as one of the world's busiest metro systems, serving about ten million passengers daily (300,000,000 people every month). Facing serious transportation problems, Moscow has plans for expanding its Metro. In 2016, the authorities launched a new circle metro railway that contributed to solving transportation issues, namely daily congestion at Koltsevaya Line.

Due to the treatment of Metro stations as possible canvas for art, characterized by the fact that workers of Moscow would get to see them every day, many Stalin-era metro stations were built in different "custom" designs (where each station's design would be, initially, a massive installation on a certain theme. For example, Elektrozavodskaya station was themed solely after nearby lightbulb factory and ceramic ribbed lightbulb sockets); the tradition of "Grand Designs" and, basically, decorating metro stations as single-themed installations, was restored in late 1979.

More recently, Moscow mayor Sergei Sobyanin has introduced comforts ranging from WiFi and USB ports and Apple Pay — while opening new stations at a breakneck pace. Moscow's metro is one of the world's busiest, handling 2.6 billion passengers in 2019.

In the Russian capital, there are over 21.5 thousand Wi-Fi access points, in student dormitories, in parks, cultural and sports institutions, and within the Garden Ring and the Third Transport Ring. From September 2020 to August 2021, 1,700 new access points to urban Wi-Fi were launched in Moscow. The structure of the Wi-Fi network allows citizens to use the Internet without re-authorization.

Monorail

The Moscow Metro operates a short monorail line (line 13). The line connects Timiryazevskaya metro station and Ulitsa Sergeya Eisensteina, passing close to VDNH (and Line 6 Metro station "V.D.N.Kh."). The line opened in 2004. It accepts overgound interchanges, no additional fare is needed if a ride was spent at Moscow Metro within previous 90 minutes.

Bus, trolleybus and electric bus

Moscow has a bus terminal for long-range and intercity passenger buses (Central Bus Terminal) with a daily turnover of about 25 thousand passengers serving about 40% of long-range bus routes in Moscow.

Every major street in the city is served by at least one bus route. Many of these routes are doubled by a trolleybus route and have trolley wires over them.

With the total line length of almost  of a single wire, 8 depots, 104 routes, and 1740 vehicles, the Moscow trolleybus system was the largest in the world. But municipal authority, headed by Sergey Sobyanin, began to destroy the trolleybus system in Moscow in 2014 due the planned replacement of trolleybuses by electric buses. In 2018 Moscow trolleybus system has only 4 depots and dozens of kilometers of unused wires. Almost all trolleybus wires inside Garden Ring (Sadovoe Koltso) were cut in 2016–2017 due to the reconstruction of central streets ("Moya Ulitsa"). Opened on November 15, 1933, it is also the world's 6th oldest operating trolleybus system.

In 2018 the vehicle companies Kamaz and GAZ have won the Mosgortrans tender for delivering 200 electric buses and 62 ultra-fast charging stations to the city transport system. The manufacturers will be responsible for the quality and reliable operation of the buses and charging stations for the next 15 years. The city will be procuring only electric buses as of 2021, replacing the diesel bus fleet gradually. According to expectations, Moscow will become the leader amongst the European cities in terms of electric and gas fuel share in public transport by 2019.

All bus stations and terminals of Moscow are now connected to free Wi-Fi. One may use it in international bus stations Salaryevo, South Gate and North Gate, and in bus terminals Varshavskaya and Orekhovo. As much as 48 hot spots were installed there.

Moscow cable car

On November 26, 2018, the mayor of Moscow Sergey Sobyanin took part in the ceremony to open the cable car above the Moskva River. The cable car will connect the Luzhniki sports complex with Sparrow Hills and Kosygin Street.

The journey from the well-known viewpoint on Vorobyovy Gory to Luzhniki Stadium will last for five minutes instead of 20 minutes that one would have to spend on the same journey by car. The cable car will work every day from 11 a.m. till 11 p.m.

It was built to transport 1,600 passengers per hour in all weathers. There are 35 closed capsules designed by Porsche Design Studio to transport passengers. The booths are equipped with media screens, LED lights, hooks for bikes, skis, and snowboards. Passengers will also be able to use audio guides in English, German, Chinese and Russian.

Tram

Moscow has an extensive tram system, which first opened in 1899. The newest line was built in 1984. Its daily usage by Muscovites is low, making up for approximately 5% of trips because many vital connections in the network have been withdrawn. Trams still remain important in some districts as feeders to Metro stations. The trams also provide important cross-links between metro lines, for example between Universitet station of Sokolnicheskaya Line (#1 red line) and Profsoyuznaya station of Kaluzhsko-Rizhskaya Line (#6 orange line) or between Voykovskaya and Strogino. Some routes used to connect downtown with sleep districts, like route 3.

There are three tram networks in the city:

 Krasnopresnenskoye depot network with the westernmost point at Strogino (depot location) and the easternmost point near platform Dmitrovskaya. The network has the highest usage in Moscow and no weak points based on turnover except to-depot lane (passengers serviced by bus) and tram ring at Dmitrovskaya (because now it is neither a normal transfer point nor a repair terminal).
 The Apakov depot services the south-western part from the Varshavsky lane – Simferopolsky boulevard in the east to the Universitet station in the west and Boulevard lane at the center. This network is connected only by the four-way Dubininskaya and Kozhevnicheskaya streets. A second connection by Vostochnaya (Eastern) street was withdrawn in 1987 due to a fire at the Dinamo plant and has not been recovered, and remains lost (Avtozavodsky bridge) at 1992. The network may be serviced anyway by another depot (now route 35, 38).
 Main three depot networks with railway gate and tram-repair plant.

In addition, tram advocates have suggested that the new rapid transit services (metro to City, Butovo light metro, Monorail) would be more effective as at-grade tram lines and that the problems with trams are only due to poor management and operation, not the technical properties of trams. New tram models have been developed for the Moscow network despite the lack of expansion.

Taxi
Commercial taxi services and route taxis are in widespread use. In the mid-2010s, service platforms such as Yandex.Taxi, Uber and Gett displaced many private drivers and small service providers and were in 2015 servicing more than 50% of all taxi orders in Moscow.

Russian tech firm Yandex is testing self-driving taxis in Moscow. Yandex's fleet of around 170 driverless cars has travelled more than 14 million kilometres. Robotaxis will available through the company's Yandex.Go application in Yasenevo district.

Railway
 Several train stations serve the city. Moscow's ten rail terminals (or ) are:

Belorussky Rail Terminal
Kazansky Rail Terminal
Kiyevsky Rail Terminal
Kursky Rail Terminal
Leningradsky Rail Terminal
Paveletsky Rail Terminal
Rizhsky Rail Terminal
Savyolovsky Rail Terminal
Yaroslavsky Rail Terminal
Vostochny railway Terminal

The terminals are located close to the city center, along with the metro ringline 5 or close to it, and connect to a metro line to the centre of town. Each station handles trains from different parts of Europe and Asia. There are many smaller railway stations in Moscow. As train tickets are cheap, they are the preferred mode of travel for Russians, especially when departing to Saint Petersburg, Russia's second-largest city.

Suburbs and satellite cities are connected by commuter elektrichka (electric rail) network. Elektrichkas depart from each of these terminals to the nearby (up to ) large railway stations.

During the 2010s, the Little Ring of the Moscow Railway was converted to be used for frequent passenger service; it is fully integrated with Moscow Metro; the passenger service started on September 10, 2016. A connecting railway line on the North side of the town connects Belorussky terminal with other railway lines. This is used by some suburban trains.

Moscow Central Circle 

The Moskovskaya Okruzhnaya Zheleznaya Doroga formed a ring around the now-downtown Moscow since 1903, but only served as a non-electrified, fueled locomotive-only railway prior to reconstruction into MCC in 2010's.

The Moscow Central Circle is a  urban-metro railway orbital line that encircles historical Moscow. It was built alongside Little Ring of the Moscow Railway, taking some of its tracks into itself as well. M.C.C. was opened for passenger use on September 10, 2016. MOZD is integrated as "Line 14 of Moscow Metro", and, while using railway-sized trains, can be perceived as "S-train-design circle line".

The line is operated by the Moscow Government owned company MKZD through the Moscow Metro, with the Federal Government owned Russian Railways selected as the operation subcontractor. The track infrastructure and most platforms are owned by Russian Railways, while MKZD owns most station buildings. However, in S-bahn way, Moscow unified tickets "Ediniiy" and "Troika" are accepted by MCC stations. There is one zero-fee interchange for any ticket used on Moscow Metro station less than 90 minutes before entering an MCC station (and vice versa: a passenger of MCC gets 1 free interchange to Moscow Metro within 90 minutes after entering MCC station)

Moscow Central Diameters 

Another system, which forms "genuine S-Bahn" as in "suburbia-city-suburbia"-designed railway, is the Moscow Central Diameters, a pass-through railways system, created by constructing bypasses from "vokzals" final stations (e.g. by avoiding the central stations of already existing Moscow Railway, used for both intercity and urban-suburban travel before) and forming a train line across Moscow's centre.

Out of 5 projected lines, the first 2 lines were completed and launched on 2019-11-21 (e.g. November 21, 2019).

While using the same rails as "regular" suburban trains to vokzals, MCD trains ("Ivolga" model) got distinguishing features (shape; red cabin, different windows, lesser amount of seats; big red "MЦΔ" train logo).

Roads

There are over 2.6 million cars in the city daily. Recent years have seen growth in the number of cars, which have caused traffic jams and lack of parking space to become major problems.

The Moscow Ring Road (MKAD), along with the Third Transport Ring and the canceled Fourth Transport Ring, is one of only three freeways that run within Moscow city limits. Several other roadway systems form concentric circles around the city.

Air
There are five primary commercial airports serving Moscow: Sheremetyevo (SVO), Domodedovo (DME), Vnukovo (VKO), Zhukovsky (ZIA), Ostafyevo (OSF).

Sheremetyevo International Airport is the most globally connected, handling 60% of all international flights. It is also a home to all SkyTeam members, and the main hub for Aeroflot (itself a member of SkyTeam). Domodedovo International Airport is the leading airport in Russia in terms of passenger throughput and is the primary gateway to long-haul domestic and CIS destinations and its international traffic rivals Sheremetyevo. It is a hub for S7 airlines, and most of OneWorld and Star Alliance members use Domodedovo as their international hub. Vnukovo International Airport handles flights of Turkish Airlines, Wizz Air and others. Ostafyevo International Airport caters primarily to business aviation.

There are a number of smaller airports close to Moscow (19 in Moscow Oblast) such as Myachkovo Airport, that are intended for private aircraft, helicopters and charters.

Water
Moscow has two passenger terminals, (South River Terminal and North River Terminal or Rechnoy vokzal), on the river and regular ship routes and cruises along the Moskva and Oka rivers, which are used mostly for entertainment. The North River Terminal, built in 1937, is the main hub for long-range river routes. There are three freight ports serving Moscow.

Sharing system

Moscow has different vehicle sharing options that are sponsored by the local government. There are several car sharing companies which are in charge of providing cars to the population. To drive the automobiles, the user has to book them through the app of the owning company. In 2018 the mayor Sergey Sobyanin said Moscow's car sharing system has become the biggest in Europe in terms of vehicle fleet. Every day about 25,000 people use this service. In the end of the same year Moscow carsharing became the second in the world in therms of fleet with 16.5K available vehicles. Another sharing system is bike sharing (Velobike) of a fleet formed by 3000 traditional and electrical bicycles. The Delisamokat is a new sharing service that provides electrical scooters. There are companies that provide different vehicles to the population in proximity to Moscow's big parks.

Future development

In 1992, the Moscow government began planning a projected new part of central Moscow, the Moscow International Business Center, with the goal of creating a zone, the first in Russia, and in all of Eastern Europe, that will combine business activity, living space and entertainment. Situated in Presnensky District and located at the Third Ring, the Moscow City area is under intense development. The construction of the MIBC takes place on the Krasnopresnenskaya embankment. The area is the only spot in downtown Moscow that can accommodate a project of this magnitude. Today, most of the buildings there are old factories and industrial complexes.

The Federation Tower, completed in 2016, is the second-tallest building in Europe. It is planned to include a water park and other recreational facilities; business, office, entertainment, and residential buildings, a transport network and a new site for the Moscow government. The construction of four new metro stations in the territory has been completed, two of which have opened and two others are reserved for future metro lines crossing MIBC, some additional stations were planned. 
 A rail shuttle service, directly connecting MIBC with the Sheremetyevo International Airport is also planned.

Major thoroughfares through MIBC are the Third Ring and Kutuzovsky Prospekt.

Three metro stations were initially planned for the Filyovskaya Line. The station Delovoi Tsentr opened in 2005 and was later renamed Vystavochnaya in 2009. The branch extended to the Mezhdunarodnaya station in 2006, and all work on the third station, Dorogomilovskaya (between Kiyevskaya and Delovoi Tsentr), has been postponed. There are plans to extend the branch as far as the Savyolovskaya station, on the Serpukhovsko-Timiryazevskaya Line. Line 4 of Moscow Metro had the longest time intervals between train arrivals (approximately 8 minutes for Mezhdunarodnaya and Vystavochnaya branch of line 4) throughout the 2010s. However, Vystavochnaya has been expanded with Line 8A platforms (segment of future Line 11), and Mezhdunarodnaya has been upgraded with line 14 platform.

The cellphone service provider MTS announced on March 5, 2021, that they would begin the country's first pilot 5G network in Moscow. 14 hotspots were positioned across the city's main tourist attractions, including Lubyanka Square near Red Square, the Moscow City financial district and the VDNKh exhibition center.

Media

Moscow is home to nearly all of Russia's nationwide television networks, radio stations, newspapers, and magazines.

Newspapers

English-language media include The Moscow Times and Moscow News, which are, respectively, the largest and oldest English-language weekly newspapers in all of Russia. Kommersant, Vedomosti and Novaya Gazeta are Russian-language media headquartered in Moscow. Kommersant and Vedomosti are among the country's leading and oldest Russian-language business newspapers.

TV and radio

Other media in Moscow include the Echo of Moscow, the first Soviet and Russian private news radio and information agency, and NTV, one of the first privately owned Russian television stations. The total number of radio stations in Moscow in the FM band is near 50.

Moscow television networks:

Moscow radio stations:

Notable people

International relations

Twin towns – sister cities
Moscow is twinned with:

Almaty, Kazakhstan
Ankara, Turkey
Astana, Kazakhstan
Baku, Azerbaijan
Bangkok, Thailand
Beijing, China
Berlin, Germany
Bucharest, Romania
Buenos Aires, Argentina
Chicago, United States
Cusco, Peru
Dubai, United Arab Emirates
Ganja, Azerbaijan
Ho Chi Minh City, Vietnam
Jakarta, Indonesia 
Kharkiv, Ukraine
Ljubljana, Slovenia
London, United Kingdom
Manila, Philippines
New Delhi, India
Prague, Czech Republic
Pyongyang, North Korea
Rasht, Iran
Reykjavík, Iceland
Riga, Latvia
Seoul, South Korea
Tallinn, Estonia
Tashkent, Uzbekistan
Tehran, Iran
Tokyo, Japan
Ulaanbaatar, Mongolia
Vilnius, Lithuania

Cooperation agreements
Moscow has cooperation agreements with:

 Bangkok, Thailand (1997)
 Lisbon, Portugal (1997)
 Madrid, Spain (2006)
 Tel Aviv, Israel (2001)
 Tunis, Tunisia (1998)
 Yerevan, Armenia (1995)

Former twin towns and sister cities
 Brno, Czech Republic (terminated due to the Russian invasion of Ukraine)
 Düsseldorf, Germany (suspended due to the Russian invasion of Ukraine)
 Kyiv, Ukraine
 Warsaw, Poland (terminated due to the Russian invasion of Ukraine)

See also

 List of churches in Moscow
 List of Moscow tourist attractions
 List of museums in Moscow
 List of shopping malls in Moscow
 Mayor of Moscow
 Moscow Millionaire Fair

References

Literature

External links

 
 
 Interactive map of housing in Moscow from 1785-2018 
 Travel2moscow.com – Official Moscow Guide
 Official Moscow Administration Site
 Informational website of Moscow
Old maps of Moscow, Eran Laor Cartographic Collection, The National Library of Israel, in Historic Cities Research Project

 
12th-century establishments in Russia
Capitals in Europe
Moskovsky Uyezd
Populated places established in the 12th century
Federal cities of Russia
Golden Ring of Russia